Lucy Rowland Lippard (born April 14, 1937) is an American writer, art critic, activist, and curator. Lippard was among the first writers to argue for the "dematerialization" at work in conceptual art and was an early champion of feminist art.  She is the author of 21 books on contemporary art and has received numerous awards and accolades from literary critics and art associations.

Early life and education 
Lucy Lippard was born in New York City and lived in New Orleans and Charlottesville, Virginia, before enrolling at Abbot Academy in 1952. Her father, Vernon W. Lippard, a pediatrician, became assistant dean at Columbia University College of Physicians and Surgeons in 1939, followed by appointments as dean of Louisiana State University School of Medicine in New Orleans and then, the same position at the University of Virginia. From 1952 to 1967, he was dean of his alma mater, Yale School of Medicine. She graduated from Smith College with a B.A. in 1958. She went on to earn an M.A. in art history in 1962 from the Institute of Fine Arts at New York University.

Just out of college, Lippard began working in the library at the Museum of Modern Art in 1958 where, in addition to reshelving the library after a fire, she was "farmed out" to do research for curators. She credits these years of working at MoMA, paging, filing, and researching, with preparing her "well for the archival, informational aspect of conceptual art." At MoMA she worked with curators such as Bill Lieberman, Bill Seitz and Peter Selz. By 1966, she had curated two traveling exhibitions for MoMA, one on "soft sculpture" and one on Max Ernst, as well as worked with Kynaston McShine on Primary Structures before he was hired by the Jewish Museum, taking the show with him. It was at MoMA that Lippard met Sol LeWitt who was working the night desk; John Button, Dan Flavin, Al Held, Robert Mangold, and Robert Ryman all held positions at the museum during this time as well.

In 1960, she married then-emerging painter Robert Ryman, who worked at MoMA as a museum guard from 1953 until 1960. Before divorcing six years later, the couple had one child, Ethan Ryman, who eventually became an artist himself.

Career 
Since 1966, Lippard has published 20 books—including one novel—on feminism, art, politics and place. She has received numerous awards and accolades from literary critics and art associations. A 2012 exhibition on her seminal book, Six Years: The Dematerialization of the Art Object at the Brooklyn Museum, titled "Six Years": Lucy R. Lippard and the Emergence of Conceptual Art", cites Lippard's scholarship as its point of entry into a discussion about conceptual art during its era of emergence, demonstrating her crucial role in the contemporary understanding of this period of art production and criticism. Her research on the move toward Dematerialization in art making has formed a cornerstone of contemporary art scholarship and discourse. Lucy Lippard was a member of the populist political artist group known as the Art Workers Coalition, or AWC. Her involvement in the AWC as well as a trip she took to Argentina—such trips bolstered the political motivations of many feminists of the time—influenced a change in the focus of her criticism, from formalist subjects to more feministic ones. Lucy Lippard is also believed to be a co-founder of West-East Bag, an international women artist network which was founded in 1971, in the early beginnings of the feminist art movement in the United States. Their newsletter W.E.B. mentioned tactics used against museums to protest the lack of female representation in museum collections and exhibitions. The group was dissolved in 1973.

In 1975, Lippard travelled to Australia and spoke to groups of women artists in Melbourne and Adelaide about the creation of archives of women artists' work on photographic slides, known as slide registers, by West-East Bag, the idea being to counteract their lack of showings in art galleries. Lippard was a major influence in the establishment of the Women's Art Movement in Australia, and developed a friendship with leading proponent Vivienne Binns, who later visited New York.

In 1976, Lucy Lippard published a monographic work on the sculptor Eva Hesse combining biography and criticism, formal analysis and psychological readings to tell the story of her life and career. The book was designed by Hesse’s friend and colleague, Sol LeWitt. Each of her seventy sculptures and many of her drawings are reproduced and discussed within the book. Being a long-time friend of Hesse, Lippard treads a fine line between public and private life. She writes about the achievements and many struggles in Hesse’s life that had an impact on who she was as a person. Eva Hesse was born in 1936, in Germany, but because of her Jewish upbringing she and her family were forced to flee from the Nazi regime in 1938, arriving in New York in 1939. During their flight, Hesse’s father kept diaries of the journey for each of the children, a habit Hesse returned to later in her life. In these diaries she talked about the struggles in her life. Hesse is an American artist known for her innovative use of materials in her sculptures, such as fibreglass, latex and plastics. This innovative use of ‘soft’ materials, have become an inspiration source for a younger generation of women artists. Lippard further writes that although Hesse died before feminism affected the art world, she was well aware of the manner in which her experience as a woman altered her art and her career. In writing this important work on Eva Hesse, Lucy Lippard has tapped into her knowledge of and passion for feminism, particularly within the art world. Although the book is long out-of-print, this classic text remains both an insightful critical analysis and a tribute to an important female artist ‘whose genius has become increasingly apparent with the passage of time.’

Co-founder of Printed Matter, Inc (an art bookstore in New York City centered on artist's books), the Heresies Collective, Political Art Documentation/Distribution (PAD/D), Artists Call Against U.S. Intervention in Central America, and other artists' organizations, she has also curated over 50 exhibitions, made performances, comics, guerrilla theater, and edited several independent publications the latest of which is the decidedly local La Puente de Galisteo in her home community in Galisteo, New Mexico. She has infused aesthetics with politics, and disdained disinterestedness for ethical activism.

In 1966, Lucy Lippard organized the exhibition Eccentric Abstraction at Fischback Gallery in New York. With this exhibition, Lippard brought together a group of abstract artists which included Alice Adams, Louise Bourgeois, Lindsey Decker, Eva Hesse, Gary Kuehn, Bruce Nauman, Keith Sonnier, and more. The exhibition focussed on the ‘use of organic abstract form in sculpture evoking the gendered body through an emphasis on process and materials.’ Lippard referred to eccentric abstraction as a “non-sculptural style,” which was closer to abstract painting than to sculpture.

She was interviewed for the film !Women Art Revolution.

Selected honors and awards 
Lippard holds nine honorary doctorates of fine arts, of which some are listed below.

2015: Distinguished Lifetime Achievement Award for Writing on Art, College Art Association
 2013: Honorary doctorate, Otis College of Art and Design 
 2013: Distinguished critic lecture, International Association of Art Critics, United States 
 2012: Distinguished Feminist Award, College Art Association 
 2010: Award for Curatorial Excellence, Center for Curatorial Studies, Bard College
 2007: Honorary Doctor of Fine Arts, honoris causa, Nova Scotia College of Art and Design (NSCAD University)
 1976: National Endowment for the Arts grant
 1975: Frank Jewett Mather Award for Criticism, College Art Association  
 1972: National Endowment for the Arts grant
 1968: Guggenheim Fellowship

Selected exhibitions
 Eccentric Abstraction, Fischbach Gallery, New York, 1966
 Rejective Art, organized by the American Federation of Arts, New York, traveled to three US venues in 1967-8
 Number 7, Paula Cooper Gallery, New York, 1969
 557,087, Seattle World's Fair Pavilion, September 1969
 955,000, Vancouver Art Gallery, 1970
 2,972,453, Centro de Arte y Communicacion, Buenos Aires, 1971
 c.7,500, CalArts, Valencia, CA, traveling throughout US and Europe, 1973–1974

Selected publications
 Undermining: A Wild Ride Through Land Use, Politics, and Art in the Changing West. New York: The New Press. 2014. 
 4,492,040. Los Angeles: New Documents. 2012. 
 Weather Report. Boulder, C.O.: Boulder Museum of Contemporary Arts. 2007. 
 On the beaten track: tourism, art and place. New York: New Press. 1999. 
 The Lure of the Local: Senses of Place in a Multicentered Society. New York: New Press. 1998.  
 The Pink Glass Swan. New York: New Press, 1995. 
 Mixed blessings: new art in a multicultural America. New York: Pantheon Books. 1990.   
 A different war: Vietnam in art. Bellingham, Wash: Whatcom Museum of History and Art. 1990.  
 "Trojan Horses: Activist Art and Power." Art After Modernism: Rethinking Representation, edited by Brian Wallis. Boston, M.A.: David R. Godine. 1985. 
 Get the message?: a decade of art for social change. New York: E.P. Dutton. 1984  
 Overlay: contemporary art and the art of prehistory. New York: Pantheon Books. 1983  
 I See / You Mean. Los Angeles: Chrysalis Books. 1979. Reprint, Los Angeles: New Documents. 2021. 
 Eva Hesse. New York: New York University Press. 1976. 
 From the center: feminist essays on women's art. New York: Dutton. 1976.  
 Six years: the dematerialization of the art object from 1966 to 1972; a cross-reference book of information on some esthetic boundaries. New York: Praeger. 1973.  
 Changing: essays in art criticism. New York: Dutton. 1971. 
 Surrealists on art. Englewood Cliffs, N.J.: Prentice-Hall. 1970.  
 Pop art. New York: Praeger. 1966. 
 The Graphic Work of Philip Evergood. New York: Crown, 1966.

See also
 Women in the art history field
 Feminist art

See also
 
 "Biography – Lippard, Lucy R. (1937-): An article from: Contemporary Authors." HTML digital publication 
 Parallaxis: fifty-five points to view : a conversation with Lucy R. Lippard and Rina Swentzell. Denver, CO : Western States Arts Federation, 1996. 
 Bonin, Vincent. Materializing Six Years: Lucy R. Lippard and the Emergence of Conceptual Art. Cambridge, MA: MIT Press, 2012. 
 Butler, Cornelia H. From Conceptualism to Feminism: Lucy R. Lippard's Numbers Shows, 1969-74. London: Afterall Books, 2012.

References

External links
 
 "Finding Her Place" Author, Author, by Kennan Daniel, Phillips Academy Bulletin, Winter 2001
 Lucy R. Lippard Papers, circa 1940–1995, Smithsonian Archives of American Art
 Lucy R. Lippard papers: Images, Smithsonian Archives of American Art
 Works by or about Lucy R. Lippard in libraries (WorldCat catalog)
 Lucy Lippard 1974: An Interview
 Guggenheim Fellows for 1968
  Frank Jewett Mather Award for Criticism from the College Art Association

1937 births
Living people
American art critics
American art curators
American women curators
American art historians
American women's rights activists
Feminist studies scholars
Frank Jewett Mather Award winners
Women art historians
American women journalists
American women critics
New York University Institute of Fine Arts alumni
People from New Mexico
Journalists from New York City
Historians from New York (state)
American women historians
Heresies Collective members
Abbot Academy alumni
21st-century American women